Mundabullangana is a settlement in Western Australia, located approximately 100 km south-west of Port Hedland. It is the site of a 225,000 hectare cattle station. Mundabullangana is more commonly known as Munda Station.

In 1872, brothers Roderick Louden MacKay and Donald McDonald MacKay, then their younger brother Donald MacKay and his son, Samuel Peter Mackay, took up a tract of country on the Yule River, where there was a good pool of permanent water, bearing the Aboriginal name Mundabullangana. Although for most of its history Mundabullangana was predominantly a sheep station, in 1985, long after it passed out of the MacKay family, it was destocked in favour of cattle.

Mundabullangana Station is significant in the occupation of the north-west of Western Australia as the first pastoral lease taken up by European settlers in the Yule and Turner River areas, in the 1870s. It became one of the largest and most successful enterprises of its kind in the nineteenth and early twentieth centuries, and its pastoral use continued through the twentieth century, and into the twenty-first century.

In 1898 the station recorded  of rain following a cyclone in the area. The Aboriginal Australian workers on the station said the Yule River ran higher than ever before as a result of the deluge.

It was acquired by the Craig brothers, who also owned Portree, Yalbago, Wandina and Maroonah Stations.

The homestead at Mundabullangana Station is a good example of Victorian Georgian style architecture. On 2 March 1984, Mundabullangana homestead was entered on the Register of the National Estate. The nomination lapsed, and it was removed from the Register on 14 May 1991.

The lessee in 2015 was Michael Thompson, who also grazes his cattle on neighbouring Boodarie Station. Following a series of incidences of poaching and arson in 2015 costing Thompson $100,000, he closed the gates to Mundabullangana and employed guards to keep the public out.

See also
List of ranches and stations

References

External links
Map of Mundabullangana

Pastoral leases in Western Australia
Stations (Australian agriculture)
1872 establishments in Australia
State Register of Heritage Places in the Town of Port Hedland